Batodonoides (often misspelled as Batonoides) is a genus of extinct shrew-like mammals, which includes a species that is possibly the smallest mammal to have ever lived. Species of Batodonoides lived about  during the early to middle Eocene Epoch in North America. The genus contains four species: the type species B. powayensis, the older B. vanhouteni, B. walshi and B. rileyi.

Species

B. powayensis
B. powayensis is based on the type specimen UCMP V-96459, and was a ground dwelling insectivore. It is based on fossilised remains recovered from California, USA.

B. vanhouteni
Based on the size of its molar teeth, it is estimated that Batodonoides vanhouteni may have weighed only 0.93-1.82 grams (with 1.3 g most likely). The species lived about 53 million years ago during the early Eocene Epoch in North America.

B. vanhouteni, described in 1998 by Bloch and colleagues, is the oldest species, and was discovered in Wasatchian deposits in Wyoming, USA. It is based on a juvenile specimen, consisting of a mandible and some teeth.

References

Prehistoric Eulipotyphla
Fossil taxa described in 1976
Fossil taxa described in 1998
Extinct mammals of North America
Eocene life
Prehistoric placental genera